José Cazorla may refer to:
José Cazorla Maure (1903–1940), Spanish communist leader during the Spanish Civil War (1936–39)
José Cazorla (sport shooter) (born 1914), Venezuelan sports shooter